Metal Up is a heavy metal album by Miracle of Sound.  Some of its songs are based on Irish folklore, and the album stayed at the top of the iTunes Metal charts for 2 days following its release in March 2015. Metal Up was described as mix of classic rock, hard rock, and metal, and was praised for its celtic influences in several songs. The album was given a 5 out of 5 score in Rock Review.

In addition to Gavin Dunne, who usually works as a one-man-band, he had two guest musicians, 331Erock and Dave Divilly, who provided guitar solos for "I am Alive" and “Get Your Metal On”, respectively.

Track listing

References 

2015 albums
Heavy metal albums by Irish artists
Rock albums by Irish artists
Celtic rock albums